Hot Country Songs is a chart that ranks the top-performing country music songs in the United States, published by Billboard magazine.  In 1969, 23 different singles topped the chart, which was published at the time under the title Hot Country Singles, in 52 weekly issues of the magazine.  Chart placings were based on playlists submitted by country music radio stations and sales reports submitted by stores.

In the issue of Billboard dated January 4, Johnny Cash's single "Daddy Sang Bass" climbed from number 19 to the top spot, replacing "Wichita Lineman" by Glen Campbell.  Cash's single remained at number one for six weeks, the longest unbroken run of the year.  The singer returned to the top of the chart later in the year with "A Boy Named Sue", which spent five weeks at number one.  His cumulative total of eleven weeks atop the chart was the highest by any artist in 1969.  Merle Haggard, Sonny James and Buck Owens each reached number one with three different singles, the most by any act.  All three of James' chart-toppers were cover versions of successful rock and roll and pop songs from the late 1950s and early 1960s; the singer achieved the majority of his more than 20 country number ones with versions of pop songs.  Owens also took a country reworking of a rock and roll classic to the top spot, with a live version of Chuck Berry's 1958 song "Johnny B. Goode".  Haggard's three chart-toppers included "Okie from Muskogee", one of the best-known songs of his career.

In March, Jerry Lee Lewis, regarded as a legend of the rock and roll genre, topped the chart with "To Make Love Sweeter For You".  In doing so he achieved a country number one for the first time since Billboard combined sales and airplay into a single chart in 1958; his last country chart-topper had been on the C&W Best Sellers in Stores chart earlier in that year.  Lewis had gained some success on the country charts in the 1950s with songs such as "Great Balls of Fire" in the rockabilly style which incorporated elements of country and rock and roll.  In 1968, however, after a decade with little success, he mounted a surprise comeback when he concentrated fully on the country genre, and would go on to achieve a succession of country chart entries into the 1970s.  Charley Pride had his first chart-topper in August 1969 with "All I Have to Offer You (Is Me)", and he quickly returned to the number one position with "(I'm So) Afraid of Losing You Again", which was the final number one of the year and thus of the decade.  The first African-American performer to become a superstar in the country music genre, Pride would go on to achieve more than thirty number one singles on the Hot Country chart.

Chart history

See also
1969 in music
1969 in country music
List of artists who reached number one on the U.S. country chart

References

1969
Country
1969 record charts